The Women's 4×200 Freestyle Relay  at the 10th FINA World Swimming Championships (25m) was swum on 15 December 2010 in Dubai, United Arab Emirates. 13 nations swam in the prelims, with the top-8 finishers swimming again in the final.

In the final, the top-4 teams all swam under the existing World Record in the event.

Records
At the start of the event, the World (WR) and Championship records (CR) was:

The following records were established during the competition:
800 Free Relay (WR): 7:35.94,  China
200 Freestyle (CR): 1:53.17,  Camille Muffat (in the final)

Results

Heats

Final

References

Freestyle relay 4x200 metre, Women's
World Short Course Swimming Championships
2010 in women's swimming